Parliamentary elections were held in Senegal on 30 July 2017, having originally been planned for 2 July.

Background
The original election date was chosen on 1 December 2016 after a meeting between the President of Senegal Macky Sall and the Opposition in the National Assembly.

The coalition of parties supporting President Sall, Benno Bokk Yaakaar, sought to retain the parliamentary majority it obtained in the 2012 parliamentary election. It included Sall's party, the Alliance for the Republic, as well as the Socialist Party and the Alliance of the Forces of Progress. The coalition's national candidate list was headed by Prime Minister Mohammed Dionne.

Plans for a united opposition coalition that would incorporate the Senegalese Democratic Party of Abdoulaye Wade as well as the supporters of imprisoned Dakar Mayor Khalifa Sall were ultimately scuttled in late May 2017 because the two sides could not agree on who should head the coalition's candidate list. Consequently the two sides decided to stand separately, with Wade and Khalifa Sall each heading their respective lists. The opposition's failure to unite was viewed as a boon for President Sall, making it appear more likely that he would keep his parliamentary majority; if his supporters lost, he would be forced into cohabitation for the remaining two years of his term, greatly curtailing his powers.

Electoral system
The 165 members of the National Assembly are elected by two methods; 90 are elected by either first-past-the-post or party bloc vote in 35 single- or multi-member constituencies based on the 35 departments, with an additional 15 elected by overseas voters. The other 60 seats are elected from a nationwide constituency by proportional representation, with seats allocated initially using the simple quotient, with remaining seats allocated using the largest remainder method.

Campaign
The official campaign period began on 8 July. Wade, who had been living in France, returned to Dakar on 10 July to begin campaigning for his coalition, Manko Wattu Sénégal.  A record number of parties, 47, contested the elections.

Results
Voter turnout was reported to be 54%. Prime Minister Dionne, speaking on 31 July, said that the pro-Sall Benno Bokk Yaakaar coalition had prevailed in 42 out of the 45 departments of Senegal (all but Kédougou, Saraya and "probably" Mbacké). The opposition coalition led by Khalifa Sall, however, said that it had won in Dakar, the capital. Results for Dakar released on 3 August showed Benno Bokk Yaakaar slightly ahead of Khalifa Sall's coalition, Manko Taxawu Sénégal.

Provisional results released on 4 August showed Benno Bokk Yaakaar winning 125 out of 165 seats, a strong majority. The two main opposition coalitions trailed distantly; Manko Wattu Sénégal (led by Wade) obtained 19 seats and Manko Taxawu Sénégal (led by Khalifa Sall) obtained seven seats. The presidential coalition was slightly short of a majority in the vote count, receiving 49.5% of the votes.

Aftermath
Following the victory of Benno Bokk Yaakaar, President Sall reappointed Dionne as Prime Minister on 6 September 2017. Abdoulaye Wade, elected to the National Assembly as the top candidate on his coalition's candidate list, announced his resignation as a Deputy on 10 September, before the National Assembly even began meeting. He explained that his purpose in running was merely to support his coalition in the election.

References

Senegal
2017 in Senegal
Elections in Senegal
July 2017 events in Africa